Onyangoncheon Station is a railway station on Seoul Metropolitan Subway Line 1 and the Janghang Line in Onyang-dong, Asan, South Korea.

The station is named for the nearby Onyang Hot Springs.

Gallery

References
http://www.koreatriptips.com/en/tourist-attractions/264270.html

Metro stations in Asan
Seoul Metropolitan Subway stations
Railway stations in South Chungcheong Province
Railway stations opened in 1922
Janghang Line
Seoul Subway Line 1